Dai Zhuang or Thu Lao is a Tai language spoken in Yunnan, China and northern Vietnam. In China is it spoken in Yanshan, Wenshan, Maguan, Malipo, Guangnan counties of Wenshan Prefecture. It is also spoken in Honghe Prefecture. The largest concentrations are in Wenshan (50% of total Zhuang population) and Yanshan (20% of total Zhuang population) counties (Johnson 2011b).

Names
Below are various names (both autonyms and exonyms) for speakers of Dai Zhuang (Johnson 2011a:43).

Pu Dai (濮岱)

Tuliao, Tulao (土僚、土老)
Tuzu (土族)
Pulao, Puliao (濮僚; ancient Chinese ethnonym)

Subdivisions and distribution
Johnson (2011b) splits Dai Zhuang into 4 dialects according to tonal splitting patterns: Northern, Central, Southern, and Northeastern. They roughly correspond with the following ethnic subdivisions (Johnson 2011a).

Northern: Piled Headdress Tu (Da Tou Tu, 搭头土, Daigelai, Black Tulao). Spoken in northern Wenshan and western Yanshan counties.
Central: Flat Headdress Tu (Ping Tou Tu, 平头土, River Bank Tulao). Spoken around the city of Wenshan, and in central Wenshan County's Panzhihua (攀枝花) Township.
Southern: Pointed Headdress Tu (Jian Tou Tu, 尖头土). Spoken in Malipo and Maguan counties.
Northeastern: Slanted Headdress Tu (Pian Tou Tu, 偏头土). Spoken in Guangnan and eastern Yanshan counties.

In Vietnam, Thu Lao (autonym: La Hừ, meaning 'black earth') is spoken in the following 7 villages (Nguyễn 2014:14).

Mường Khương District, Lào Cai Province
Tả Gia Khâu Commune
La Hờ (48 households, 228 individuals)
La Măng (26 households, 123 individuals)
Lũng Thắng (15 households, 71 individuals)
Tào Túng, Thanh Bình Commune, Mường Khương District, Lào Cai Province (5 households, 28 individuals)
Si Ma Cai District, Lào Cai Province
Sin Chải, Thảo Chư Phìn Commune (42 households, 199 individuals)
Khuốn Pống, Bản Mộ Commune (29 households, 138 individuals)
Tả Chải, Nàn Sán Commune (71 households, 337 individuals)

Jerold Edmondson describes Thu Lao as a Central Tai language with about 200 speakers that retains voiced initial consonants in low tones, like Tay of Trùng Khánh District, Cao Bằng Province.

Yunnan (1979) reports that a Tai-speaking group called the Baiyi 摆彝 live in Wenshan City, Maguan County, and Qiaotou Township 桥头苗族壮族乡 of Hekou Yao Autonomous County. Yunnan (1979) suggests that it may be similar to Tai Lue. The Baiyi are classified as ethnic Dai in Hekou, and as Zhuang in Wenshan and Maguan. In 1960, the Baiyi had a population of 6,958.

Phonology
Many Dai Zhuang dialects preserve voiced stops inherited from Proto-Tai (L-Thongkum 1997). L-Thongkum calls the dialects with the voiced stops "Dai Tho," and the dialects without any voiced stops "Tai Tho."

See also
Tày language of Vietnam

References

Further reading
 Johnson, Eric C. 2011a. "The Southern Zhuang Languages of Yunnan Province's Wenshan Prefecture from a Sociolinguistic Perspective." [Working paper]. S.l.: s.n. 49 pages.
 Johnson, Eric C. 2011b. "A Lexical and Phonological Comparison of the Central Taic Languages of Wenshan Prefecture, China: Getting More Out of Language Survey Wordlists Than Just Lexical Similarity Percentages." SIL Electronic Working Papers 2011-005: 170.
 L.-Thongkum, Theraphan. 1997. "Implications of the retention of proto-voiced plosives and fricatives in the Dai Tho language of Yunnan Province for a theory of tonal development and Tai language classification." In Comparative Kadai: The Tai branch, Jerold A. Edmondson and David B. Solnit (eds.). pages 191-219. Summer Institute of Linguistics and the University of Texas at Arlington Publications in Linguistics 124. Dallas: Summer Institute of Linguistics and the University of Texas at Arlington.
Ngô Đức Thịnh & Chu Thái Sơn (1975). "Mấy ý kiến góp phần xác minh người Thu Lao ở Lào Cai". In, Ủy ban khoa học xã hội Việt Nam: Viện dân tộc học. Về vấn đề xác định thánh phần các dân tộc thiểu số ở miền bắc Việt Nam, 256-273. Hà Nội: Nhà xuất bản khoa học xã hội.
Maguan County Ethnic Affairs Bureau. 2008. The Dai people of Maguan County [马关傣族]. Kunming: Yunnan People's Press [云南民族出版社].

Tai languages